Piccadilly Arcade runs between Piccadilly and Jermyn Street in central London. It was opened in 1909, having been designed by Thrale Jell, and is a Grade II listed building. 

The arcade is composed of twenty-eight shops on the ground floor. The first floor was originally offices, but converted to the Felix Hotel in 1915. The buildings were bombed in 1941 during World War II and not fully restored until 1957.

Among the shops in the arcade are the Royal Warrant holder Benson & Clegg, who moved here in 1976 from their previous location in Jermyn Street.

A bronze statue of Beau Brummell sits at the Jermyn Street end of the arcade, designed by Irena Sidiecka.

See also
 Princes Arcade - nearby arcade also running from Piccadilly to Jermyn Street
 Burlington Arcade - arcade on the opposite side of Piccadilly

References
Citations

Sources

External links 
 
 
Piccadilly Vaults
 The Armoury of St. James's

Buildings and structures on Piccadilly
Grade II listed buildings in the City of Westminster
Portman estate
Shopping centres in the City of Westminster
Shopping arcades in England
Tourist attractions in the City of Westminster
1909 establishments in England